Jiten Murmu is an Indian footballer who plays as a forward for Bhawanipore in the CFL Premier A. He was born on 31st July 1994 in bankura, West Bengal. His youth career was from the year 2013-2015 in East Bengal and various other regions and was promoted to the senior team in 2015. He made his first professional in the year 2021 in Punjab.

Career 
Born in West Bengal, Jiten began his career with the East Bengal academy and then promoted to the senior team in 2015. He made his first professional debut in the I-League for Roundglass Punjab on 9 January 2021. He started in the first eleven and played entire 90 minutes as Punjab FC defeated Aizawl 1–0.

References

External links 

 

East Bengal Club players
Living people
I-League players
Association football forwards
Indian footballers
1994 births
Peerless SC players
People from Bankura
Footballers from West Bengal